Hamaxia mutatum is a species of tachinid flies in the genus Hamaxia of the family Tachinidae.

External links

Tachinidae